Jordan Blaine Samuels-Thomas (born May 28, 1990) is an American , National Hockey League Referee and former professional ice hockey player. He was selected by the Atlanta Thrashers in the seventh round (203rd overall) of the 2009 NHL Entry Draft. Jordan graduated Quinnpiac University In 2014 with a Bachelors and Masters degree in communications while also competing for the universities Division I mens Ice-Hockey Program. He signed his first NHL contract with the Buffalo Sabres following his Senior season, playing 6 years professionally before becoming an official.

Playing career
Samuels-Thomas played junior hockey with the Waterloo Black Hawks of the United States Hockey League (USHL) before attending Bowling Green State University to play the 2009–10 and 2010–11 seasons with the Bowling Green Falcons. He then transferred to Quinnipiac University where he played the 2012–13 and 2013–14 seasons with the Quinnipiac Bobcats men's ice hockey team. During his four years of college hockey Samuels-Thomas played 148 games, registering 50 goals, 54 assists, and 162 penalty minutes.

On July 9, 2014, the Winnipeg Jets traded his NHL rights to the Buffalo Sabres in exchange for a conditional seventh-round pick in the 2015 NHL Entry Draft, and three days later, on July 12, 2014, the Buffalo Sabres signed him to a one-year, entry-level contract. The Sabres chose not to retain his rights after that season.

On September 24, 2015, Samuels-Thomas was signed by the Ontario Reign. He was briefly assigned to the Manchester Monarchs of the ECHL at the beginning of the season, but then was recalled back to the Reign.

On December 30, 2017, while in the midst of his second season with the Gulls, Samuels-Thomas was released from his AHL contract after appearing in 18 games for just 2 points. On January 3, 2018, he signed his first contract abroad with Mladá Boleslav of the Czech Extraliga (ELH) until the end of the 2017–18 season. After just four games with them Samuels-Thomas switched teams again and signed with Augsburger Panther of the Deutsche Eishockey Liga on January 25, 2018.

As a free agent from the Panthers in the off-season, Samuels-Thomas moved to the neighbouring Austrian Hockey League, agreeing to a one-year deal with Croatian-based, KHL Medveščak Zagreb, on August 1, 2018. In the 2018–19 season, Samuels-Thomas contributed with 11 points through 17 games before opting to leave the club mid-season. On January 18, 2019, having returned to North America, he signed an AHL contract with the Hershey Bears for the remainder of the season and was immediately assigned to ECHL affiliate, the South Carolina Stingrays.

On September 29, 2019, approaching the 2019–20 season, Samuels-Thomas agreed to continue his career in the ECHL, signing with the Worcester Railers. He registered 11 goals and 29 points in 33 games with the Railers, before leaving the club to return to Europe for the remainder of the season, agreeing to a contract with German DEL2 club, Heilbronner Falken on February 3, 2020.

Officiating career
On January 29, 2021, Samuels-Thomas ended his playing career after six professional seasons. He would remain in ice hockey, opting to pursue a career as an official. He would be hired on a minor-league contract by the NHL for the 2021–22 season, working a few preseason games with veteran officials. His first official game in the NHL was on April 14, 2022 for a game between the San Jose Sharks and Chicago Blackhawks.

Career statistics

Awards and honors

References

External links
 

1990 births
Living people
African-American ice hockey players
American men's ice hockey left wingers
Atlanta Thrashers draft picks
Augsburger Panther players
Bowling Green Falcons men's ice hockey players
Florida Everblades players
Heilbronner Falken players
Ice hockey players from Connecticut
KHL Medveščak Zagreb players
Manchester Monarchs (ECHL) players
BK Mladá Boleslav players
National Hockey League officials
Ontario Reign (AHL) players
People from West Hartford, Connecticut
Quinnipiac Bobcats men's ice hockey players
Rochester Americans players
San Diego Gulls (AHL) players
South Carolina Stingrays players
Utah Grizzlies (ECHL) players
Waterloo Black Hawks players
Worcester Railers players
21st-century African-American sportspeople
American expatriate ice hockey players in the Czech Republic
American expatriate ice hockey players in Croatia
American expatriate ice hockey players in Germany